The Ambassador from Israel to El Salvador is Israel's foremost diplomatic representative in El Salvador.

List of ambassadors

Mattanya Cohen 2021-
Amir Ofek (Non-Resident, San José) 2018 - 
Oren Bar-El 2015 - 2018
Shmulik Arie Bass 2011 - 2014
Mattanya Cohen 2007 - 2011
Tsuriel Raphael 2006 - 2007
Jonathan Peled 2004 - 2006
Yosef Livne 2001 - 2004
Aryeh Zur 1998 - 2001
Yosef Livne 1993 - 1997
David Cohen (diplomat) 1990 - 1993
Baruch Gilad 1988 - 1990
Avraham Sarlouis 1978 - 1980
Yaacov Deckel 1974 - 1978
Joshua Nissim Shai (Non-Resident, Guatemala City) 1959 - 1964
Minister David Shaltiel (Non-Resident, Mexico City) 1956 - 1959
Minister Yossef Keisari (Non-Resident, Mexico City) 1954 - 1956

References

El Salvador
Israel